Tupi may refer to:

 Tupi people of Brazil
 Tupi or Tupian languages, spoken in South America
 Tupi language, an extinct Tupian language spoken by the Tupi people
 Tupi oil field off the coast of Brazil
 Tupi Paulista, a Brazilian municipality
 Tupi, South Cotabato, a Philippine municipality
 Tupi National High School
 Tupi class, a Brazilian Navy version of the Type 209 submarine
 Tupi (submarine), the lead submarine of the class, commissioned in 1989
 Tupi Football Club, a Brazilian football (soccer) club
 Brazil national rugby union team, nicknamed Os Tupis
 Rede Tupi, the first Brazilian TV network (1950–1980)
The tupi blackberry, a Mexican hybrid of the Comanche and Uruguai varieties
 Tupi (software), free and open source 2D animation software
 Tupí fermented cheese

See also
 Tupiniquim, an Amerindian tribe who live in Brazil
 Tupy (disambiguation)

Language and nationality disambiguation pages